Gore Airport  is an airport serving Gore in Ethiopia.

See also

Transport in Ethiopia

References

External links
 OurAirports - Ethiopia
  Great Circle Mapper - Gore
 Gore

Airports in Ethiopia